TSOTB may refer to:
 The Story of Tracy Beaker. A show from CBBC.
 The Sins of Thy Beloved